The 8 cm Raketen-Vielfachwerfer was a copy of the Soviet BM-8 Katyusha multiple rocket launcher produced in Nazi Germany during the Second World War.

History
The Soviet BM-8 Katyusha rocket launchers first encountered during Operation Barbarossa left a big impression on the invading Germans. Proposals to copy the Katyusha for German use were soon made but there wasn't much spare industrial capacity available for new projects. There also wasn't a great deal of enthusiasm for the project because the German Army had already committed to the production of spin-stabilized rocket systems such as the Nebelwerfer.

Since the Waffen-SS was the military wing of the Nazi Party it was often in competition with the Wehrmacht for resources. This meant the Waffen-SS often used its political influence to create its own network of suppliers outside the influence of the Wehrmacht to supply its troops. A product of this competition for resources was the 8 cm Raketen-Vielfachwerfer which was almost a direct copy of the BM-8 and often armed Waffen-SS units.

Design

Launcher 
The launcher consisted of two rows of parallel perforated steel rails which the rockets were mounted on. The launch rails could launch either German or captured Russian rockets.  The rails were then mounted on tubular steel frames on a variety of vehicles. Two of the most common mounts were an armored SOMUA MCG German designation S307(f) half-track modified by Alfred Becker for use by the Wehrmacht or a German Sd.Kfz. 4 half-track.

Rocket 
The rocket called the 8 cm Raketen Sprenggranate was a simple cordite fueled, fin stabilized,  diameter, high-explosive rocket patterned closely on the Russian M-8. The body was simple and inexpensive to produce due to the use of stamped sheet metal components, unlike the more expensive machined venturis used by spin-stabilized rockets.  The fins of the 8 cm Raketen Sprenggranate differed from the M-8 and were mounted at 2° to impart spin to improve accuracy.

Rocket Comparison

Photo Gallery

Notes

References

 Chamberlain, Peter (1975). Mortars and Rockets. Gander, Terry. New York: Arco Pub. Co. 
 Spielberger, Walter (1989). Die Halbketten-Vehicles des deutschen Heeres 1909–1945. Motorbuch Verlag.

External links

Rocket artillery
World War II artillery of Germany
Weapons and ammunition introduced in 1943